Javier Vázquez may refer to:
Javier Vazquez (fighter) (born 1976), Cuban mixed martial artist
Javier Vázquez (baseball) (born 1976), Puerto Rican baseball player
Javier Vázquez (musician), Afro-Cuban songwriter, arranger, and pianist with Sonora Matancera
Javi Vázquez (born 2000), Spanish footballer

See also
Jorge Javier Vázquez (born 1970), Spanish TV host